Artocarpus gomezianus is a tree in the family Moraceae and a wild species on the breadfruit/jackfruit genus (Artocarpus); it may be referred to as the 'sampang' and its Vietnamese name is mít chay.  Distribution records are from: Assam, through Indo-China to west Malesia.

Subspecies 
The Catalogue of Life lists:
 A. gomezianus gomezianus
 A. gomezianus zeylanicus

Gallery

References

External links 
 
 

gomezianus
Flora of Indo-China
Flora of Malesia